Dow Nunatak is a small, relatively isolated nunatak 3.5 nautical miles (6 km) northwest of Mount Sinha in the southwest part of McDonald Heights, Marie Byrd Land, Antarctica. It was mapped by the United States Geological Survey from surveys and U.S. Navy air photos, 1959–65, and was named by the Advisory Committee on Antarctic Names for Charles R. Dow, who participated in glaciological research at Byrd Station, 1969–70.

References 

Nunataks of Marie Byrd Land